Syndicate is a locality in the Shire of Douglas, Queensland, Australia.

Geography 
The locality is entirely within the Daintree National Park.

References 

Shire of Douglas
Localities in Queensland